A floodway is a flood plain crossing for a road, built at or close to the natural ground level. It is similar to a causeway, but crosses a shallow depression that is subject to flooding, rather than a waterway or tidal water.

They are designed to be submerged under water, but withstand such conditions. Typically floodways are used when the flood frequency or time span is minimal, traffic volumes are low, and the cost of a bridge is uneconomic – in most cases, in rural areas.

See also
Flood control channel
Glossary of road transport terms
Low water crossing

Notes

External links

Flood control
Transportation engineering
Rivers
Hydraulic engineering